A rabbit is a mammal.

Rabbit, The Rabbit or Rabbits may also refer to:

Places
 Rabbit Mountain, a volcano in the Yukon, Canada
 Rabbit River (Michigan), United States
 Rabbit River (Bois de Sioux), Minnesota, United States
 Rabbit River (Mississippi River), Minnesota, United States
 Rabbit Island (disambiguation), in various countries

Arts and entertainment

Film and stage
 Night of the Lepus (1972), a horror film also known as Rabbits
 Rabbits (film), a 2002 series of short films
 Chained (2012 film), working title Rabbit
 The Rabbits, a music theater work

Music
 Rabbit (band), a rock band from 1973 to 1977
 Rabbit (Japanese band), a Japanese band that formed in 2012
 Rabbit (album), by Collective Soul
 "Rabbit" (song), by Chas & Dave

Paintings
 The Rabbit (Manet 1866), a painting by Édouard Manet
 The Rabbit (Manet 1881), also by Manet

Fictional characters
 Rabbit (Winnie-the-Pooh), in the Winnie the Pooh stories
 Rabbit Angstrom, the central character in the Rabbit novel series by John Updike
 Rabbit, a steam-powered clockwork robotic musician in the musical project Steam Powered Giraffe
 Rabbit, from the Australian TV series Round the Twist
 Peter Rabbit
 Roger Rabbit
 Jessica Rabbit
 The title character of Reader Rabbit, a children’s educational game franchise established in 1983

Other arts and entertainment
 Rabbit (Koons), a sculpture by Jeff Koons
 Rabbits (podcast), a pseudo-documentary podcast

Technology
 Rabbit (nuclear engineering)
 Rabbit (telecommunications), a telephone service
 Rabbit, sequenced flashing lights in an approach lighting system for air traffic
 Rabbit Semiconductor, a micro-controller manufacturer
 Rabb.it, a video streaming service

Computing
 Rabbit (cipher), a high-speed stream cipher
 Rabbit program, a type of malware
 RabbitMQ, an open source message broker, sometimes referred to as "Rabbit"
 Rabbits, large values around the beginning of the list in sorting; See Comb sort

Sports
 Pacemaker (running) or rabbit, a type of race competitor
 Rabbit, a term in the game of cricket
 Svendborg Rabbits, a Danish basketball team

Transportation
 Fuji Rabbit, a motor scooter
 Grey Rabbit, a defunct bus company in the United States
 Philippine Rabbit, a bus company
 Volkswagen Rabbit, a car

People
 Rabbit (nickname), a list of people

Other uses
 Rabbit (zodiac), in the Chinese zodiac
 Rabbit vibrator, a type of sex toy

See also

 Br'er Rabbit, a fictional character as Uncle Remus tells stories of the Southern United States
 "Rabbit rabbit rabbit", a British superstitious phrase
 Bunny (disambiguation)
 Eddie Rabbitt (1941–1998), country singer
 Rabit (musician), an American producer of experimental electronic music
 Rabbet, a carpentry term
 Rabbitt (disambiguation)
 Rabbitte, a surname of Irish origin